Laïty Kama (born 1939 in Dakar  -  6 May 2001), was a Senegalese lawyer of Serer heritage and the first president of the International Criminal Tribunal for Rwanda (ICTR). He was one of the longest serving judges of the ICTR.

Legal career

Kama's major career started in 1969 when he became a Magistrate in Senegal, and an Examining Judge in Diourbel (Senegal) from 1969 to 1973. He was then appointed Deputy Public Prosecutor from 1973 to 1974 and Public Prosecutor in Thiès from 1974 to 1978.

He served as Assistant Public Prosecutor at Dakar's Court of Appeal and the Assize Court for 15 years.

In 1992, Kama was appointed First Assistant Public Prosecutor at the Supreme Court of Appeal.

In May 1995, he was appointed judge of the United Nations' International Criminal Tribunal for Rwanda. He was also the First President of the ICTR. Kama remained a judge of the Court until June 1999.

Lecturer and organization established
Kama taught at École nationale de la Magistrature du Sénégal in Dakar for 20 years, an organization he co-founded.

Legacy
As an expert on International Criminal Law, Kama represented Africa in the Working Group on Arbitrary Detention which was established  by the United Nations Commission on Human Rights. In this post, he presided over the drafting sessions of Benin's new code of Criminal Prosedure.  Since his membership of the Senegalese delegation to the United Nations Commission of Human Rights in Geneva from 1983 to 1990, he actively participated in the negotiations of the Convention against torture, inhuman, or degrading treatment or punishment. In 1991, he conducted seminars on human right violations and the administration of justice at Kigali (in Rwanda).  Similar seminars were conducted at Bujumbura (in Burundi) in 1993.

Death
In mid-April 2001, Kama fell ill and was hospitalized in Nairobi (Kenya) where he was reported to have "received treatment for respiratory and heart problems".  He died on 6 May 2001.  On his death, The United Nations' flag was flown at half-mast outside the International Criminal Tribunal for Rwanda (ICTR). The ICTR Chief of Press and Information Tom Kennedy described his death as a "sad loss."

Notes

External links
 Hirondelle News Agency International justice reporting
 New York Times
 United Nations - ICTR

Serer lawyers
Serer judges
20th-century Senegalese lawyers
Senegalese judges
1939 births
2001 deaths
Presidents of the International Criminal Tribunal for Rwanda
International Law Commission officials
Senegalese judges of United Nations courts and tribunals